Sisters' Cemetery, also known as Holy Names Cemetery, is a cemetery adjacent to the Marylhurst University campus, in Marylhurst, Oregon, United States. It is owned by the Sisters of the Holy Names of Jesus and Mary (SNJM), U.S.-Ontario Province and maintained by the SNJM Oregon Regional Office.

References

External links

 
 

Cemeteries in Oregon
Marylhurst University